On 1 October 1923, Sir Charles Coghlan took charge as the first Premier of the Southern Rhodesia after the referendum in 1922 which decided not to join the Union of South Africa but chose responsible government instead.

List of Ministers 
Following is a list of the 8 ministers of the First Cabinet 

As well as financial matters, the Treasurer ran the postal, telegraph and telephone services, as well as customs and excise. The Attorney-General was responsible for the police and prisons as well as legal and judicial affairs.

Ministers were permitted to prefix their names with "The Honourable".

The High Commissioner retained his nominal authority over Southern Rhodesia, but his powers were mostly devolved upon the Governor in Council.

Sir Charles Coghlan, Premier and Minister of Native Affairs
Percival Donald Leslie Fynn, Treasurer

References 

Politics of Rhodesia